The Janus Experiments investigated the effects of exposure to neutron radiation and gamma radiation on mice and dogs. They consisted of ten large scale experiments conducted at Argonne National Laboratory from 1972 to 1989. To explore various relationships, the studies varied radiation type, dose rates, total dose and fractionation. The work formed the basis of dozens of publications in the medical literature.

The original studies were funded by the United States Department of Energy. Later grants from NASA and additional funding from the Department of Energy enabled researchers at Northwestern University to make the data public through mouse and dog portals that permit radiation researchers to search for and request specific tissues from the studies' archives. These resources continue to be used in studies of radio-sensitivity, for example, at the laboratory of Gayle Woloschak at Northwestern University.

Studies of the survival and causes of death of the control groups of mice and dogs, which were not exposed to radiation, were the basis of the development by S. Jay Olshansky and Bruce A. Carnes of their biodemographic theory of intrinsic mortality.

References

External links
 Woloschak lab

Radiation health effects research
Animal testing in the United States
Medical physics
Carcinogenesis